Scleranthus diander commonly known as tufted knawel, is a flowering plant in the family Caryophyllaceae, it grows in eastern states of Australia and the Australian Capital Territory. It is a small, spreading herb with white or light green flowers.

Description
The bracts are sharply tipped, cream-coloured, usually longer than the flowers, calyx more or less pointed, spreading and mostly longer than the floral tube.

Taxonomy
Scleranthus diander was first formally described in 1810 by Robert Brown and the description was published in Prodromus florae Novae Hollandiae.The specific epithet (diander) means "two stamens".

Distribution and habitat
Tufted knawel grows in woodland, grassland, pastures and dry habitats in eastern states of Australia and the Australian Capital Territory.

References

Flora of New South Wales
Flora of South Australia
Flora of Tasmania
Flora of Victoria (Australia)
Flora of the Australian Capital Territory
Caryophyllaceae